The SMRT Active Route Map Information System (stylized as STARiS) is a rail travel information system developed in house by communications engineers from SMRT Corporation for its North South Line and East West Line (NSEWL) trains in Singapore. This system was officially announced on 7 November 2008 and firstly installed on board a C151 train, set 053/054 for a 2-month trial. This was later extended to other trains from February 2009.

History
The first STARiS was installed on a C151 trainset 053/054 for a 2-month trial. STARiS was later extended to all other existing trains on the NSEWL. C151A trains had STARiS installed during the manufacturing process. This version is based on the LTA font, symbols and based on a white background with a separate VFD for displaying text located aside from the Active Route Map and 6 LED bulbs, indicating which side(s) that train doors would open.

The next generation of STARiS, "STARiS version 2.0", has real-time multi-purpose displays that features landmarks in the vicinity of a station when the train arrives at a station. Animated advertisements are also available. STARiS 2.0 was presented during the Customer Experience Innovation Conference on 21 January 2016. STARiS 2.0 are currently installed onboard all C151B and C151C trains, which was equipped during the manufacturing process. STARiS 2.0 was supposed to be retrofitted to C651 trains during their refurbishment (which has been cancelled in 2018) as well as all other existing trains before the opening of Canberra MRT station, but it did not materialise. C751B trainset 321/322 used to have a trial version of "STARiS version 2.0" installed onboard car 3322 from late-2010, but it was eventually removed in early 2016.

On 18 April 2019, an updated version of the original STARiS display was spotted on board a C151A trainset 511/512. The new STARiS bears a new look, and has 3 provisional LED bulbs. 2 for the future Brickland and Sungei Kadut stations on the North South Line, which are part of the 2040 Land Transport Master Plan. Another one more additional LED is for unknown. All C151A trains have received the upgrade, while the rest of the other trains with the original STARiS were not upgraded as they will be retired and replaced by Alstom Movia CR151 trains by 2026. Instead, stickers have been pasted on the route maps of these trains to remind commuters that Canberra Station will not light up, as it does not have a LED provisioned on the maps.

Overview
STARiS comprises a system of 4 Vacuum Fluorescent Displays (VFD) mounted at an angle from the ceiling and 8 active route maps mounted above every door in each car. The VFDs indicate the train service's direction of travel, terminal station, side of doors opening, doors closing messages, current station, next station, interchange station and displays multi-language text synchronized with in-train audio announcements. The active route maps indicate the line of travel, direction of travel, side of doors opening, current station, next station, terminal station, interchange station and the corresponding line for interchange. All STARiS 2.0 active route maps are based upon Android.

References

SMRT Corporation
Mass Rapid Transit (Singapore)
Public transport information systems